Adoxophyes acrocindina is a species of moth of the family Tortricidae first described by Alexey Diakonoff in 1983. It is found in Indonesia on Sumatra and Seram. The habitat consists of dipterocarp forest, cassowary forest, lower and upper montane forests.

References

Moths described in 1983
Adoxophyes
Moths of Indonesia